The 2019–20 Miami Hurricanes men's basketball team represented the University of Miami during the 2019–20 NCAA Division I men's basketball season. Led by ninth-year head coach Jim Larrañaga, they played their home games at the Watsco Center on the university's campus in Coral Gables, Florida as members of the Atlantic Coast Conference (ACC).

The Hurricanes finished the season 15–16, and 7–13 in ACC play.  They lost to Clemson in the second round of the ACC tournament.  The tournament was cancelled before the Quarterfinals due to the COVID-19 pandemic.  The NCAA tournament and NIT were also cancelled due to the pandemic.

Previous season
The Hurricanes finished the 2018–19 season 14–18, 5–13 in ACC play to finish in a tie for eleventh place. They defeated Wake Forest in the first round of the ACC tournament before losing to Virginia Tech.

Offseason

Departures

Incoming transfers

2019 recruiting class

Roster

Source:

Schedule and results
Source:

|-
!colspan=12 style=| Exhibition

|-
!colspan=12 style=| Regular season

|-
!colspan=12 style=| ACC tournament

Rankings

*AP does not release post-NCAA Tournament rankings

References

Miami Hurricanes men's basketball seasons
Miami
Miami Hurricanes men's basketball team
Miami Hurricanes men's basketball team